The 2004–05 season was the 81st season in the existence of AEK Athens F.C. and the 46th consecutive season in the top flight of Greek football. They competed in the Alpha Ethniki, the Greek Cup and the UEFA Cup. The season began on 11 September 2004 and finished on 25 May 2005.

Overview
The season found AEK faced with annihilation, since their debts were unmanageable and unmanageable for anyone. The former star of the team, Demis Nikolaidis and a group of partners and friends of the team, put on the carpet the plan of being included in the article 44 of the bankruptcy law and on July 7, 2004 he took over the administration. Article 44 was an inspiration of the economist Giorgos Kintis, who elaborated the plan and as soon as the first financiers and the leader Nikolaidis were found, hope began to fade. AEK went to court, but its first application in May was rejected. In the meantime, Nikolaidis, having the full support of the team's audience, came to an agreement with the majority of the footballers for part of the dues and planned as best he could the continuation of the team's competition. Nikolaidis proceeded with some partial agreements, managed and set up a budget and mainly persuaded the team's former coach Fernando Santos to return to Greece, with a clause that if the team went bankrupt, he would be free. The material that the Portuguese had in his hands to work with is lacking, the big stars had left with the only remaining ones, Kostas Katsouranis and Nikos Liberopoulos and the veterans Nikos Kostenoglou and Nikolaos Georgeas, while at the end of the transfer period, with personal actions of Santos, they acquired on loan from Porto Bruno Alves and Paulo Assunção. Meanwhile, the Article 44 legal battle continued and the season of uncertainty began with the world turning its attention to the very existence of AEK, which depended on the court's final verdict. The fans of AEK showed their opposition to the annihilation of the team in every way either with a banner in Rizoupoli or with the historic rally of October 2004 in the centor of Athens, where more than 10 thousand people demonstrated in favor of saving the team. Vindication came on November 18 and now the team looked to the future with optimism.

Freed from the stress of existence itself and in an unprecedented climate of rallying and unity, AEK began an incredible run in the league with back-to-back victories and April found them equal contenders for the championship. AEK became the favorite, since in front of them is the easy game against Ionikos at the Olympic Stadium, but the team from Nikaia with a goal at the end, will cut the hopes for the championship in history and as if that was not enough, the white team is also coming a draw in the game against Panathinaikos at Leoforos Alexandras Stadium, in a match where AEK had many complaints from the referee, limited AEK to third place.

The participation in the groups of the UEFA Cup was of vital importance for AEK, who were in dire need of the income from the European participation, which was barely secured from UEFA. The Slovenians from Gorica seemed like an easy opponent, but for AEK, which were in the uncertainty of bankruptcy, they turned out to be difficult. The game at Sports Park went wrong from the beginning, as AEK conceded a goal, but luckily, they equalized by the end of the half-time. The score did not change despite the pressure from the Slovenians, AEK stood up and became the favorite. The tense rematch was played in an intense atmosphere in Georgios Kamaras Stadium, after AEK fans turned it into a sustained protest against the negative decision of the article 44. The team in the first half tried, but in the second half they were in serious danger even with exclusion from the Slovenians, but with a goal at the end of the game, AEK advanced to the group stage. There, in a relatively difficult draw, they found themselves in the same group as Sevilla, Lille, Zenit Saint Petersburg and Alemannia Aachen, where they had a very bad campaign with 4 defeats in equal matches, thus staying out of the continuation of the tournament.

The course of the team in the Cup was similar, where after eliminating PANO Malia and Agios Dimitrios, they found in front of them the double winner of the previous season, Panathinaikos. The first leg ended in a draw at the Olympic Stadium, after Liberopoulos equalized the goal of Konstantinou. Panathinaikos confirmed the title of favourite, until the return leg, on a big night for AEK, who opened the scoring through Katsouranis early on, but were equalized after heavy pressure from Panathinaikos. Somewhere there the team of Santos woke up and immediately took the lead again, until in the 77th minute Vladimir Ivić in his most important goal with AEK, sealed an emphatic qualification calling the fans of the host to be quiet. The quarter-finals seemed like an easy mission for AEK and indeed Panionios turned out to be an easy opponent, since after the indifferent 0–0 at Nea Smyrni, prevailed easyly by 2–0. AEK were in the semi-finals and they were going for the double. Their opponent were Olympiacos who had re-hired Dušan Bajević, whom they dominated at the Olympic Stadium, despite the final loss with 0–1. The rematch at Karaiskakis Stadium seemed difficult, but AEK scored and the match went to extra time. The referee and his assistanst were doing everything they could to push Olympiacos to qualify and thus with the expulsion of Júlio César the game turned into a monologue for Olympiacos who was redeemed by an own from Moras and while the attacks of AEK were cut as allegedly offside, Okkas sealed his team's qualification 2 minutes before the end of extra time. AEK were eliminated in the semi-finals that were admittedly better than their opponent.

Players

Squad information

NOTE: The players are the ones that have been announced by the AEK Athens' press release. No edits should be made unless a player arrival or exit is announced. Updated 30 June 2005, 23:59 UTC+3.

Transfers

In

Summer

Winter

Out

Summer

Winter

Loan in

Summer

Loan out

Summer

Renewals

Overall transfer activity

Expenditure
Summer:  €280,000

Winter:  €740,000

Total:  €1,020,000

Income
Summer:  €500,000

Winter:  €0

Total:  €500,000

Net Totals
Summer:  €220,000

Winter:  €740,000

Total:  €520,000

Manager stats

Only competitive matches are counted. Wins, losses and draws are results at the final whistle; the results of penalty shootouts are not counted.

Pre-season and friendlies

Alpha Ethniki

League table

Results summary

Results by Matchday

Fixtures

Greek Cup

First round

Round of 32

Round of 16

Quarter-finals

Semi-finals

UEFA Cup

First round

Group stage

UEFA rankings

Team kit
2004

|
|
|2005

|
|
|
|

Statistics

Squad statistics

! colspan="13" style="background:#FFDE00; text-align:center" | Goalkeepers
|-

! colspan="13" style="background:#FFDE00; color:black; text-align:center;"| Defenders
|-

! colspan="13" style="background:#FFDE00; color:black; text-align:center;"| Midfielders
|-

! colspan="13" style="background:#FFDE00; color:black; text-align:center;"| Forwards
|-

! colspan="13" style="background:#FFDE00; color:black; text-align:center;"| Left during Winter Transfer Window
|-

|-
|}

Disciplinary record

|-
! colspan="17" style="background:#FFDE00; text-align:center" | Goalkeepers

|-
! colspan="17" style="background:#FFDE00; color:black; text-align:center;"| Defenders

|-
! colspan="17" style="background:#FFDE00; color:black; text-align:center;"| Midfielders

|-
! colspan="17" style="background:#FFDE00; color:black; text-align:center;"| Forwards

|-
! colspan="17" style="background:#FFDE00; color:black; text-align:center;"| Left during Winter Transfer window

|-
|}

Starting 11

References

External links
AEK Athens F.C. official website

Greek football clubs 2004–05 season
2004-05